Avaz Lar Sayyadlar (also Romanized as ʿAvaz̤ Lar Sayyādlar) is a village in Virmuni Rural District, in the Central District of Astara County, Gilan Province, Iran. At the 2006 census, its population was 67, in 15 families.

Language 
Linguistic composition of the village.

References 

Populated places in Astara County